David H. Raulet is an immunologist who specializes in studying the role of natural killer cells. He is a professor in the Department of Molecular and Cell Biology at the University of California, Berkeley where he also holds the Esther and Wendy Schekman Chair in cancer biology. He was elected to the National Academy of Sciences in 2019. Raulet is also the co-founder of Dragonfly Therapeutics, a company that seeks to use natural killer cells for cancer immunotherapy.

Early life and education 
Raulet was born in Buffalo, New York. He graduated from the University of Michigan with a bachelor's degree in microbiology. He then received his Ph.D. in biology from the Massachusetts Institute of Technology. Raulet went on to conduct postdoctoral research in the Department of Pathology at the Perelman School of Medicine at the University of Pennsylvania.

Independent career 
Raulet joined the faculty at MIT in 1983, and moved to the Department of Molecular and Cell Biology at the University of California, Berkeley in 1991.

References

Year of birth missing (living people)
American immunologists
Living people
University of Michigan alumni